Agniya Vasilyevna Desnitskaya (Russian: А́гния Васи́льевна Десни́цкая) (23 August 1912 — 18 April 1992) was a Soviet and Russian linguist, a specialist in Indo-European languages, esp. Germanic languages and the Albanian language, literature and folklore. Professor of Leningrad State University, candidate member of the USSR Academy of Sciences via Department of Literature and Language (from 26 June 1964).

Her first works cover Indo-European and Germanic questions (in line with Leningrad Grammatical School); Desnitskaya later specialized herself as an Albanologist, becoming in effect the first specialist in Albanian philology in Russia and the founder of Albanology in Saint Petersburg. Her more important works are "History of Albanian literature" (1987) and a description of Albanian language and its dialects (1968).

Bibliography

Works on Albanian language 

 «Славянские заимствования в албанском языке» (1963)
 «Реконструкция элементов древнеалбанского языка и общебалканские лингвистические проблемы» (1966)
 «Албанский язык и его диалекты» (1968).

Sources 

http://slovar.cc/enc/bse/1992558.html

1912 births
1992 deaths
People from Chernigov Governorate
Communist Party of the Soviet Union members
Corresponding Members of the Russian Academy of Sciences
Corresponding Members of the USSR Academy of Sciences
Recipients of the Order of Friendship of Peoples
Recipients of the Order of the Red Banner of Labour
Albanologists
Germanists
Historical linguists
Indo-Europeanists
Linguists from the Soviet Union
Women linguists
Herzen University alumni
Academic staff of Herzen University